Jaszkowo may refer to the following places:
Jaszkowo, Środa Wielkopolska County in Greater Poland Voivodeship (west-central Poland)
Jaszkowo, Śrem County in Greater Poland Voivodeship (west-central Poland)
Jaszkowo, Kuyavian-Pomeranian Voivodeship (north-central Poland)